Albert Curtz (Curtius in Latin; 1600, Munich – December 19, 1671, Munich), was a German astronomer and member of the Society of Jesus.  He expanded on the works of Tycho Brahe and used the pseudonym of Lucius Barrettus.

Background
The Latin version of the name Albert Curtz, Albertus Curtius is an anagram of his pseudonym, Lucius Barretus.

Together with Johann Deckers, Kepler, Francesco Maria Grimaldi, and Jean-Baptiste Riccioli, he contributed to our early understanding of the Moon.

He published Historia coelestis [ex libris commentariis manuscriptis observationum vicennalium viri generosi Tichonis Brahe] and Augustae Vindelicorum, Simonem Utzschneiderum in 1666.

The crater Curtius on the Moon was named after him.

References

See also
List of Jesuit scientists
List of Roman Catholic scientist-clerics

1600 births
1671 deaths
17th-century German astronomers
17th-century German Jesuits
Jesuit scientists